Edward J. McLaughlin (May 16, 1917 – October 20, 1965) was an American boxer and a member of "The McLaughlin Brothers" gang of Charlestown, Massachusetts. Vincent Teresa, former mobster described Edward in his biography "My Life in the Mafia" as, "Punchy was just as crazy as George... a legbreaker for the longshoreman's union (International Longshore and Warehouse Union). Punchy was a cuckoo and as hotheaded as they came." After his brother Bernard McLaughlin was murdered in October 1961 by their former friend, "Winter Hill Gang" leader James "Buddy" McLean (Punchy and his brothers had been known to perform hits for gangs all over New England, including the Winter Hill Gang), Punchy and brother George McLaughlin murdered Russell Nicholson who was rumored to be McLean's driver in the shooting. After surviving many assassination attempts, one where he lost a hand and another where he lost half his jaw, Punchy was on his way to Boston's Suffolk Superior Courthouse for his brother Georgie's murder trial, and was shot dead at the Spring Street Metropolitan Transit Authority Loop in West Roxbury, Massachusetts.

References
English, T. J. Paddy Whacked: The Untold Story of the Irish American Gangster. New York: HarperCollins Publishers Inc., 2005. 
Teresa, Vincent My Life in the Mafia

External links
Edward (Punchy) McLaughlin

1917 births
1965 deaths
Boxers from Boston
American gangsters
Murdered American gangsters of Irish descent
Mafia hitmen
Male murder victims
People murdered in Massachusetts
Deaths by firearm in Massachusetts
People murdered by the Winter Hill Gang
Gangsters from Boston